Sutherland Springs is an unincorporated community located on the old Spanish land grant of Manuel Tarin in northern Wilson County, Texas, United States.  It is located on U.S. Highway 87 at the intersection of Farm Road 539.

On November 5 2017, Sutherland Springs local church became the scene of the  deadliest shooting in a place of worship when 26 people were killed and 22 other were injured, before the shooter committed suicide.

History 

Sutherland Springs was platted in 1854, and named after John Sutherland Jr., a pioneer citizen. A post office has been in operation at Sutherland Springs since 1851.

2017 shooting

On November 5, 2017, Devin Patrick Kelley shot 26 people dead and injured 22 at the community's First Baptist Church. The gunfire was heard by Stephen Willeford, a church neighbor and former NRA instructor, who grabbed his weapon and ran toward the scene barefoot. Willeford seriously wounded Kelley in a rapid exchange of gunfire, then corralled a nearby car and chased Kelley as he tried to flee the scene in his truck. After a high-speed chase, Kelley succumbed to a self-inflicted gunshot wound to the head. He was found dead in a roadside ditch. It was the deadliest mass shooting in Texas history and the fifth deadliest mass shooting in the history of the United States.

Geography
Old Sutherland Springs occupies a portion of the south bank of Cibolo Creek, with New Sutherland Springs (which is mostly in ruins) on the north bank of the creek.

Bibliography
The Good Old Days: A History of LaVernia was published by members of the civic government class at LaVernia High School for the 1936-37 academic school year.
 Wilson County Centennial 1860-1960 was published by the Wilson County Library; it is the official centennial program handed out by the local community for the "100-year celebration" of the county's establishment.

References

External links
 Sutherland Springs Museum
  A Guide to Sutherland Springs
 Handbook of Texas on Sutherland Springs
 

Unincorporated communities in Texas
Unincorporated communities in Wilson County, Texas
Greater San Antonio
Populated places established in 1854
1854 establishments in Texas